Leucopogon decussatus is a species of flowering plant in the heath family Ericaceae and is endemic to the south-west of Western Australia. It was first formally described in 1859 by Sergei Sergeyevich Sheglejev in the Bulletin de la Société impériale des naturalistes de Moscou.
The specific epithet (decussatus) means "decussate".

Leucopogon decussatus occurs in the Esperance Plains and Mallee bioregions of south-western Western Australia and is listed "not threatened" by the Government of Western Australia Department of Biodiversity, Conservation and Attractions.

References

decussatus
Ericales of Australia
Flora of Western Australia
Plants described in 1859